The Dominica national basketball team represents the island country of Dominica in international competitions. It is administrated by the Dominica Amateur Basketball Association.

Its best result was 6th place at the 2000 Caribbean Championship.

Competitions

FIBA AmeriCup
yet to qualify

Caribebasket

See also
Dominica women's national basketball team
Dominica national under-17 basketball team

References

External links
Archived records of Dominica team participations
Dominica Amateur Basketball Association  - Facebook Presentation
Dominica Men National Team 2015 Presentation at Latinbasket.com

Videos
 St Kitts vs Dominica Basketball Youtube.com video

Men's national basketball teams
Basketball
Basketball in Dominica
1984 establishments in Dominica